is a Japanese television drama series that was aired on Nippon Television. The series started on 15 April 2006 and ended with 11 episodes on 24 June 2006. It was the first drama in which Naohito Fujiki played a lead role. It also starred Erika Toda and Aragaki Yui.

Story 
Geronimo III sends Shinosuke across the ocean to Shibuya, Tokyo, Japan, on a quest to find a girl named Imoko. Shinosuke stirs up commotion in the shopping district with his eccentric, misplaced cowboy attitude as he disrupts the town with his lasso. On his adventure, he meets the girls of Angel Heart.

Characters 

Members of Angel Heart 
Yui Aragaki as  leader of Angel Heart's black group, 18 years old

Characters in America 
Arata Furuta as Geronimo III, a perplexing Native American, 40 years old
Kenji Anan as George, Geronimo's friend, 43 years old

Reception
Gal Circle was a modest ratings success, earning an average 12.94% rating over the series.

References

External links
 ギャルサー (official Japanese site)

2006 Japanese television series debuts
2006 Japanese television series endings
Japanese drama television series
Nippon TV dramas
Gyaru in fiction